Omnilateralism (from omnibus in Latin "for all and by all") is used as a term in international relations in order to distinguish movements towards comprehensive global governance from the current multilateral institutions that have evolved since the Congress of Vienna based on the Westphalian System with its focus on the sovereignty of nations.

History
Historically, the Prussian philosopher Immanuel Kant defined omnilateral in the Science of Right, the first part of the Metaphysics of Morals (1797), as "derived from the particular wills of all the individuals".

Omnilateralism as a political philosophy
While multilateralism refers only to multiple countries working in concert on a given issue, omnilateralism connotes a wider participation by all and a broader purpose for all. Hence, it includes not only nations in the United Nations, but also Non-Governmental Organisations as well as private actors and Civil society at large that can together contribute to the advancement of the common global good. 

The term omnilateralism is in particular used in the context of issues that can be solved neither unilaterally by one country, nor bilaterally between two countries, or plurilaterally at a regional level, like the European Union, or multilaterally by institutions such as the G20 or the United Nations, since they do not encompass all actors concerned.

Omnilateral issues
Typical issues of omnilateralism relate to the global environment, avoidance of conflicts of civilisations, multiculturalism and minorities.

See also
Polarity in international relations
Plurilateral agreement
Bilateralism
Unilateralism
New world order (politics)
United Nations
European Union

References

Sources
 The European Union and the United States in East Asia: The Need for Omnilateralism, A Personal View by a European, in: World Affairs, New Delhi, July–September 1997, p. 94-109, by Wolfgang Pape

International relations theory
Political theories
Multilateral relations